Peperomia velloziana is a species of perennial plant in the genus Peperomia. It primarily grows in wet tropical biomes.

Etymology
"velloziana" came from the surname "José Mariano de Conceição Vellozo". José Mariano de Conceição Vellozo was a Brazilian botanist from Minas Gerais.

Distribution
Peperomia velloziana can be found in Brazil, Colombia, and Costa Rica. Specimens can be found at an elevation of 147-5000 meters.

Brazil
Minas Gerais
Extrema
Serra do Lopo
Unaí
Mariana
Alto Caparaó
Paraná
Ponta Grossa
Goiás
Formosa
São Paulo
Bom Jesus dos Perdões
Distrito Federal
Brasília
Santa Catarina
Garopaba
Morro da Ressacada
Santa Catarina
Praia Grande
Joinville
Serra Dona Francisca
São Bento do Sul
Bahia
Abaíra
Colombia
Caquetá
Meta
Vereda El Triunfo
Costa Rica

Subtaxa
These subtaxa are accepted.

Peperomia velloziana f. ovata 
Peperomia velloziana var. subnovemplinervia

References

velloziana
Flora of South America
Flora of Brazil
Plants described in 1847
Taxa named by Friedrich Anton Wilhelm Miquel